Ana Abina (born 30 July 1997) is a Slovenian handball player for ŽRK Krka and the Slovenian national team.

She is the sister of Ema Abina.

International honours
EHF Cup Winners' Cup:
Semifinalist: 2016

References

External links

1997 births
Living people
Handball players from Ljubljana
Slovenian female handball players
Competitors at the 2018 Mediterranean Games
Mediterranean Games bronze medalists for Slovenia
Mediterranean Games medalists in handball